"Úsmev" is a song by the band Modus released on OPUS in 1977.

The composition that featured lead vocals by Janko Lehotský, Miroslav Žbirka, Marika Gombitová and Miroslav Jevčák won the Golden award at the Bratislavská lýra '77 in the contest of the Czechoslovak authors. It also received the Audience Choice award.

Originally, the song was released on the vinyl compilation OPUS '77. To B-side of the single was attached a solo track by Gombitová, "Deň ako z pohľadnice" (written by Lehotský with Zoro Laurinc).

Official versions
 "Úsmev" - Studio version, Bratislavská lýra, 1978

Credits and personnel
 Janko Lehotský - lead vocal, music
 Miroslav Žbirka - lead vocal
 Marika Gombitová - lead vocal
 Miroslav Jevčák - lead vocal
 Kamil Peteraj - lyrics
 OPUS Records - copyright

Awards

Bratislavská lýra
Bratislavská lýra was an annual festival of popular songs in former Czechoslovakia, established in 1966 in Bratislava. Two competitions were held; the category of Czechoslovak songwriters and the international contest. Winners were awarded by a golden, silver and/or bronze Lyre (depending on a position). Special prizes included Audience Choice, Journalists Choice, and Lifetime Achievement award. Gombitová won seven awards in total - three golden lyres (1977–78), one of silver (1979) and bronze (1980), plus an Audience Choice award (1977).

Footnotes

References

General

Specific

External links 
 
 

1977 songs
1977 singles
Modus (band) songs
Marika Gombitová songs
Songs written by Ján Lehotský
Songs written by Kamil Peteraj
Slovak-language songs